Colin Goetze Campbell (born November 3, 1935) is an American who served as the thirteenth president of Wesleyan University and the President of the Rockefeller Brothers Fund and the Colonial Williamsburg Foundation.

Early life
He is the son of Joseph Campbell and the former Marjorie Louise Goetze.   His father was the 4th Comptroller General of the United States and his mother served as president of the board of governors for the Mansfield Training School.  His parents divorced and his father remarried to artist and philanthropist Dorothy Stokes Bostwick, the daughter of Albert Carlton Bostwick and granddaughter of Standard Oil founding shareholder, Jabez A. Bostwick.

Campbell attended Cornell University, where he served as the chairman of the Orientation Executive Committee and on the Willard Straight Hall Board of Managers. He was also elected to the Sphinx Head Society in his senior year, before graduating in 1957. Campbell went on to earn a law degree from Columbia Law School in 1961.

Career
Campbell worked at the American Stock Exchange prior to becoming the executive vice president and administrative vice president of Wesleyan University in order to fulfill his lifelong interest in serving the public good.  In 1970, after Edwin Etherington left Wesleyan to make an unsuccessful run for the United States Senate as a Republican candidate from Connecticut, Campbell was elected as the university's thirteenth, and youngest, president.  He served as president of the university until 1988 when he was succeeded by William Chace, the former vice provost of Stanford University.

Campbell left Wesleyan on July 31, 1988 to join the Rockefeller Brothers Fund, a nonprofit charitable organization. He is currently the Chairman Emeritus of the Colonial Williamsburg Foundation.

Personal life
Campbell was married to Nancy Nash, who later served as chair of the National Trust for Historic Preservation. Together, they have two children.

Notes

Presidents of Wesleyan University
1935 births
Living people
Columbia Law School alumni
Cornell University alumni
Wesleyan University people